This is a list of notable former students of St Peter's College, Auckland and at its predecessor school, St Peter's School.
(Following the "Introduction" section below is an alphabetical list.)

Introduction

"Old Boys of Distinction"
St Peter's College has honoured old boys as "old boys of distinction" including the following: 
 Denis George Brownetenth Catholic Bishop of Auckland (1983–1994) and second Catholic Bishop of Hamilton (1994–2014)
 Cyril Eastlakerugby league player who captained New Zealand at the 1954 World Cup and also played at the 1960 World Cup

 Eddie Kohlhase attended St Peter's in 1975 only; world champion softball player and coach
 Lt. Col (Ret.) Chris Mullane attended St Peter's in 1958 only; soldier and advocate for veterans' affairs 
 Ronald Trubuhovichmedical doctor and pioneer of critical care medicine in Auckland

Writers, artists, All Blacks and clergy

Old boys also include writers and poets Sam Hunt, Terry Locke, David McGill, Michael Morrissey, John Trenwith, Mark Williams, and from the earlier St Peter's, William Eugene Outhwaite. Artists George Baloghy and Glen Davis also attended the school. There are nine old boys who became All Blacks including Bernie McCahill, second five-eighth and centre three-quarter (1987–1991) and, currently, the lock, Patrick Tuipulotu and the wing, AJ Lam. Two Catholic bishops, Edward Russell Gaines (1926–1994), the first Bishop Hamilton (1980–1994) and his successor Denis George Browne attended the school, as did nearly 100 Catholic priests, deacons and religious. In the nineteenth century, Matthew Joseph Brodie (1864–1943), second Bishop of Christchurch received part of his education at the "Pitt St [Catholic] School" (St Peter's School).

Soldier/diplomat and banker

Martyn Dunne (as Brigadier) commanded New Zealand and international forces in East Timor (1999–2000). With the rank of Major general, he became Commander Joint Forces New Zealand in the New Zealand Defence Force (2001–2004) and was New Zealand High Commissioner to Australia (2011–2013). Michael Fay, New Zealand merchant banker, chair of the campaigns for three New Zealand challenges for the America's Cup in 1987, 1988 and 1992, attended the school in the early 1960s.

Politicians
St Peter's has also produced politicians including five Members of Parliament (four of them were also Cabinet Ministers) and a Mayor of Auckland. Notable alumni who served in public office include:
 Chris CarterMember of Parliament for Te Atatū and Cabinet Minister of several portfolios, including as Minister of Conservation
 Peter Dignanwas the fifteenth, and first New Zealand-born, Mayor of Auckland (St Peter's School)
 William Joseph Napierwas a Liberal Party Member of Parliament in the City of Auckland multi-member electorate (St Peter's School) 
 John Sheehanwas the first New Zealand-born Member of Parliament elected by a general electorate (rather than a Māori electorate) and the first New Zealand-born person to hold cabinet rank served as Minister of Justice and Minister of Maori Affairs (St Peter's School)
 John Tamiherewas Member of Parliament for Hauraki and Tamaki Makaurau; was Minister of Small Business, Minister of Youth Affairs, Minister of Statistics and Minister for Land Information; President of Te Pāti Māori.
 Joseph Toleserved as Minister of Justice (St Peter's School)

Alphabetical list

A
 Nick Afoatenor and former New Zealand age grade rugby union football player
 Jordan Artsmember of duo Kids of 88, programming/keyboards; was a member of Incursa, a St Peter's College band which won the Smokefreerockquest in 2004
 Vince Asorugby union football player for Auckland in the ITM Cup and the Hurricanes in Super Rugby

B
 Derek Balleprofessional Standardbred horse trainer.
 David Barry, pediatrician<ref>[https://knowledgebank.org.nz/audio/barry-dr-david-michael-joseph-interview/ Barry, "Dr David Michael Joseph Interview", Knowledge Bank, Hawke's Bay Digital Archive Trust] (Retrieved 11 November 2022)</ref>
 George Baloghyartist
 Myer Bevanprofessional footballer; plays for Swedish team Husqvarna FF in Division 1 Södra, on loan from Vancouver Whitecaps FC, and the All Whites
 Michael Birchjournalist, Senior Australian Associated Press Correspondent in Vietnam in 1968; killed on 5 May 1968 in Saigon
 Jarred Blakiston (born 1991) New Zealand actor and writer.
 Brian James Blacktopsolicitor; Assistant Public Trustee (1973–1981); Deputy Public Trustee (1981–1999)Obituary, Brian James Blacktop 1937–2007, Council Brief, The Monthly newspaper of the Wellington District Law Society, Issue 362.
 Robert Brennanpriest of the Missionary Society of St. Columban; missionary and social activist in South Korea
 Pat Brittendenradio broadcaster
 Matthew Joseph Brodiesecond Bishop of Christchurch; received part of his education at the "Pitt St [Catholic] School" (St Peter's School)
 David BrownePapua New Guinea footballer
 Denis George Browne Catholic bishop; Bishop of Rarotonga (1977–1983); tenth Bishop of Auckland (1983–1994); second Bishop of Hamilton (1994–2014)New Zealand Who's Who Aotearoa 2001, p.177
 Tony BuckleyIrish international rugby player

C
 Donald John Cameronjournalist and sportswriter
 Hon. Christopher Joseph CarterAuckland local politician (2011–present); former senior United Nations official, New Zealand Labour Party politician, Member of Parliament for Te Atatū, and cabinet minister
 Marcus Chang (born 28 May 1983) Taiwanese actor and singer-songwriter.
 Barney Clarkechampion New Zealand boxer

 Robert Courtneychampion New Zealand Paralympian in wheelchair sprints; gold and bronze medal winner at the 1972 Heidelberg Paralympics; bronze medalist at the 1984 Summer Paralympics

D
 Graeme Dallowlaw professor; and Assistant Commissioner of Police
 Paul DallowNew Zealand athletics representative as a hurdlerWestern Suburbs Athletic Champions, New Zealand Representation in the 21 years to 1966, Western Suburbs Athletic & Harrier Club (retrieved 6 November 2012)
 Ross Dallow senior member of the New Zealand Police; Auckland local government politician 
 Simon DallowNew Zealand television presenter and lawyer
Sam de JongLos Angeles based music producer, songwriter, and multi-instrumentalist
 Peter Dignanfifteenth and first New Zealand-born Mayor of Auckland 
 Felix Cornelius Donnellypriest of the Diocese of Auckland, ordained in 1954; writer of non-fiction, novelist, academic, broadcaster, counsellor and founder of Youthline
 Patrick James "Pat" Downey barrister and solicitor, Human Rights Commissioner, legal editor
 Ron Duffyinternational rugby league player
 Major-General (rtd) Martyn Dunne soldier, senior public servant, and diplomat

E
 Cyril Eastlakerugby league international, member and captain of the Kiwis, St Peter's College's first international footballer
 Matt Elliottwriter, biographer, historian (including a history of St Peter's College) and former New Zealand stand-up comedian

F

 Sir Michael Faymerchant banker; co-founder/joint chief executive and director of Fay, Richwhite and Co Ltd; chair of the campaigns for New Zealand challenges for the America's Cup in 1987, 1988 and 1992
 Denis C. Feeneyprofessor of Classics and Giger Professor of Latin at Princeton University
 Michael James Fitzgeraldassociation football player, represented New Zealand at international level, plays club football for V-Varen Nagasaki on loan from Albirex Niigata

 Nepia Fox-Matamuaprofessional rugby union player
 Taina Fox-Matamuaprofessional rugby union player for the Tasman Mako in the Mitre 10 Cup competition

G

 Edward Russell Gainesfirst Bishop of HamiltonO'Neill, p. 108.
 Peter Robert Goddardeducationalist who attended St Peter's College 1943–1949"A new award for the 2012 festival", KBB Music Festival (Retrieved 14 August 2012)

H

 Simon Hafokaprofessional rugby player and coachIndependiente Rugby Club Santander: .
 Bryn Hallrugby player, plays scrum half for the Blues; captained the 2012 Junior All Blacks; Captain of the St Peter's College First XV in 2010
 Garth Harristax lawyer
 Paul Raymond Harrischief executive of the New Zealand Electoral Commission
 Shane Paul Howarthrugby union player, played for the All Blacks, also played for Wales; rugby union coach
 Chris HuljichAuckland manufacturer, merchant, entrepreneur, rentier and philanthropist
 Michael HuljichAuckland manufacturer, merchant, entrepreneur, rentier and philanthropist
 Paul Richard HuljichCEO of New Zealand's Best Corporation; American author of self-help books
 Sam Hunt poet
 Peter John Hurleyphysician and researcher in nuclear medicine; Dux of the College, 1956St Peter's College Magazine 1983, p. 7.

I

J

 Mate I. J. JakichAuckland representative rugby union player
 Colin Jillings (1931 – 2022)trainer of thoroughbred horses and former jockey
 Matthew Johnsonrugby union player for the Blues in the Super Rugby competition
 Niko Jones (born 2000) – rugby union player playing for Auckland in the National Provincial Championship in 2022 as flanker.
 Stephen JonesOlympic rower
 Bro Vincent Michael Innocent Jury  (1933 - 2023) B.Sc (Hons) (in pure and applied mathematics) (Sydney); M.Sc(?) (Otago?)(1962); BA (1970); Dip.Ed: old boy of St Peter's College; taught at St Peter's College 1967-1974; Principal of two secondary schools (St Thomas of Canterbury College and Trinity Catholic College, Dunedin); pastoral worker and community adult education administrator and teacher, Christian Brothers outreach, the Edmund Rice Community, in Murupara, Bay of Plenty (1992-2008).

K
 Richard KearneyDistrict Court judge; former member of the Waitangi Tribunal
 Robert William Keebarrister; Director of Human Rights Proceedings"New Director of Human Rights Proceedings named", NZLS (Retrieved 4 February 2013)
 Kids of 88band comprising Jordan Arts and Sam McCarthy
 Chris Kohlhasesoftball player, former member of the New Zealand national team the Black Socks; coach of the Samoan softball team
 Eddie Kohlhase softball player; former member of the New Zealand national team the Black Socks; former coach of the Black Socks; member of the St Peter's College 4×100 metre team, National Champions and record holders for over 10 years
 Michael KruseChief Justice of American Samoa

L
 Ben Lam (born 1991)rugby union player; first old boy of St Peter's College to win a 2014 Commonwealth Games medal in the Rugby sevens
 Pat Lamrugby union player and coach; played in the All Blacks; teacher at St Peter's College (1991–1992); uncle of Ben LamGerry Thornley, False Front Up, Rise Up: The Official Story of the Connacht Rugby Miracle, 2016, p.86ff (Retrieved 27 January 2023)
 Anthony Gerald Lanigan engineer; first Chancellor of Auckland University of Technology; founding director and vice-Chairman, Habitat for Humanity International; chairman of the Senate of Good Shepherd College1st Asia-pacific House Forum, Dr Tony Lanigan
 David LewisNew Zealand Men's Tennis Doubles Champion (with J. Dunphy) 1984–1985; member of the New Zealand Davis Cup squad 1985, the younger brother of Chris Lewis and Mark LewisMaxwell, Rick. p. 23Davis Cup website: players: David Lewis (retrieved 17 November 2011)
 Mark Lewisprofessional tennis coach; New Zealand Men's Tennis Singles Champion 1979–80; New Zealand Men's Tennis Doubles Champion 1983–1984; member of the New Zealand Davis Cup team in 1980 and 1981; younger brother of Chris Lewis and older brother of David Lewis
 Stefan Lipalawyer; president of the Social Credit Party (1979–1987)
 Terry Lockepoet, anthologist, academic, dux of St Peter's College 1965, won Junior National Scholarship 1965
 Jamie LoveNew Zealand representative softball player; Captain of the Junior Black Sox Softball Team 2008; old boy of St Peter's College (2001–2007)

M

 Thomas MahoneyAuckland architect (St Peter's School)
 William MahoneyAuckland's first New-Zealand-born priest (St Peter's School)
 Kevin Malloyinternational chief executive, Starcom MediaVest Group (SMG) (advertising)
 Jack Manning(1928–2021), New Zealand architect, designer of AMP Building, Auckland (1962) and the Majestic Centre, Wellington (1991) and many other buildings; awarded the New Zealand Institute of Architects (NZIA) Gold Medal 2011
 Bernie McCahillrugby union player; played with the All Blacks
 Sean McCahillrugby union player; represented Ireland
 Arden McCarthy – rugby league player; Fullback/wing/centre position; current Club, Vodafone Warriors (previously played for Cronulla Sharks and Richmond Rovers).
 Sam McCarthyguitarist and vocalist; member of duo Kids of 88; member of Incursa, a St Peter's College band which won the Smokefreerockquest in 2004
 Patrick McClure third sector leader; former CEO of Mission Australia, St Vincent de Paul, Retirement Villages Group, Macquarie Group; former Chair of the Government review of the welfare system in Australia
 Hugh McGahan former New Zealand rugby league representative; captain of the KiwisHughie: Hugh McGahan, Kiwi Captain, Nicholls Publishing, Lincoln, Canterbury, 1992, pp. 13–17
 David Keith McGillVUW, writer and publisher, journalist, former chair of Amnesty International Aotearoa New Zealand; also educated at Holy Name Seminary
 Denzil Meulipriest of the Diocese of Auckland; lawyer, writer, former editor of the Zealandia and a leading New Zealand traditionalist Catholic
 Constant MewsProfessor of Medieval Thought and Director, Centre for Studies in Religion and Theology, Monash University
 Douglas Mewsmusician, academic, performer, conductor
 Bradley Moni Mikarugby union player; played with the All Blacks, Auckland, Blues and Crusaders
 Dylan Mikarugby union player; played with the All Blacks

 Lisati Milo-Harrisrugby union player; member of the Chiefs in Super Rugby
 Anthony Molloy lawyer, tax and trust law expert, author, editor, winegrower
 Joe Moodabeoperator of the large cinema chain Amalgamated Theatres, and other cinema enterprises
 Michael Moodabeoperator of the large cinema chain Amalgamated Theatres, and other cinema enterprises
 Royce Moodabeoperator of the large cinema chain Amalgamated Theatres, and other cinema enterprises
 Michael Morrisseypoet and fiction writer
 Lt. Col. (rtd.) Christopher Mullane New Zealand army officer
 Peter Mussonbassoonist

N
 William Joseph Napier (1857–1925), lawyer, Liberal Party Member of Parliament for the City of Auckland electorate multi-member electorate 1899–1902"Mr W J Napier" in "Auckland City and Suburban Members of the House of Representatives" The Cyclopedia of New Zealand, The Cyclopedia Company Limited, Christchurch, 1902, Volume 2 Auckland, p. 7 (St Peter's School)
 Gray Nelson (1927 - 2022), original student at St Peter's College; senior public servant (private secretary to 5 NZ prime ministers); diplomat
 Steve Nesbit (Steven Roberto) (born 1936), All Black, first five-eighth (1960) (St Peter's College's first old boy All Black)
 Frank Nobilo (Frank Ivan Joseph) (born 1960) CNZM (1998, for services to golf), professional golfer; New Zealand representative
 Dion Nukunuku (born 1970), member of the New Zealand national softball team, the Black Socks
 Nathan Nukunuku (born 1980), member of the New Zealand national softball team, the Black Socks

O
 Brian Desmond O'Flaherty (born in Wellington, 1938), New Zealand horse-racing and equestrian journalist, television equestrian sports commentator and equestrian sports administrator; Executive Director, NZ Thoroughbred Breeders' Assn.
 Patrick O'Reilly (1843–1914), Monsignor, Catholic priest and educationalist in the Diocese of Auckland (St Peter's School)
 Mana Otai (born 1968), International Rugby Union player, representing Tonga; captain of Tonga at 1995 Rugby World Cup; All Black trialist 1994
 Michael Otto (1975-81) Editor of NZ Catholic; Dux of the college 1981

 Charles Thomas Outhwaite (1845–1925), sportsman and lawyer; oldest son of Thomas Outhwaite; educated in Auckland (St Peter's School, Auckland) and Paris; associate to Sir George Arney, Chief Justice of New Zealand; his sister, Isa Outhwaite, donated the St Peter's College site to the Bishop of Auckland for education purposes; brother of William Eugene Outhwaite
 William Eugene Outhwaite (1847–1900), writer, poet, sportsman, sports enthusiast, critic and lawyer; second son of Thomas Outhwaite; brother of Charles Thomas Outhwaite; educated in Paris and at St Peter's School, Auckland,

P

 Stephen Parke (born 1950), PhD (in Theoretical Particle Physics) (1980) (Harvard), physicist
 John Patterson (born 1855); Auckland city councillor 1900–1903 and 1908–1911; prominent Auckland businessman; coachbuilder, wheelwright, farrier, and general blacksmith (St Peter's School)
 Martin Pringle (born 1964), representative cricket player in New Zealand A; Auckland representative cricket player

R
 Anthony George Ravlich (born in Auckland, 1949), activist, politician and writer in the area of human rights, especially in relation to economic, social and cultural rights
 Martin Reyners (Martin Everardus) (born 1950), leading New Zealand scientist in seismology and plate tectonics
 Dane Aaron Rumble (born 1982), recording artist, former member of New Zealand hip hop group Fast Crew

S

 Francis Saili (born 1991), New Zealand rugby player, who plays at the centre position for Munster (Ireland) and played for the Blues in Super Rugby; named a member of the All Blacks in 2013; brother of Peter Saili
 Peter Saili (born 1989), New Zealand rugby player, plays at the flanker position for the Blues in Super Rugby; brother of Francis Saili
 Ronald Fong Sang (1938–2021) (born in Fiji) ONZM (2000 for services to architecture and the arts), BArch (1961) Auck, Auckland architect, art collector, art exhibiter and publisher of New Zealand art books
 Patrick James Sheahan (1928–2013), prominent Auckland publican, publisher and sportsman; a first day pupil of St Peter's College in 1939"Obituaries: Pat Sheahan", SPOBA  (Retrieved 1 November 2013)
 John Sheehan (1844–1885), lawyer, 19th-century New Zealand politician; the first New Zealand-born Member of Parliament elected by a general electorate (rather than a Māori electorate); first New Zealand-born person to hold cabinet rank; Member of Parliament 1872–1885; Cabinet Minister from 1877–1879 – Minister of Justice and Minister of Māori Affairs (St Peter's School)
 Sean Solia (born 15 1992), professional cricketer representing Auckland.
 Denny Solomona (born in Auckland, 1993), rugby league player for the Castleford Tigers in the Super League; previously played with London Broncos and the Melbourne Storm under 20sDenny Solomona, Official Website of the Melbourne Storm  (Retrieved 9 July 2013)
 Andrew Stroud (born 1967), retired New Zealand superbike champion
 Antony Sumich (born 1964), rugby union and cricket international, priest of Priestly Fraternity of Saint Peter
 Rory Sweetman (born 1956), New Zealand historian, specialising especially in Irish history and the history of the New Zealand Catholic church

T

 John Tamihere (John Henry) (born 1959), lawyer, New Zealand Labour Party and Te Pāti Māori politician, former Member of Parliament, Cabinet Minister, talkback host, Maori leader; political commentator
 Jonathan Temm QC (1962–2021), barrister, Rotorua, President of the New Zealand Law Society (2010–2013)
 Luteru Tolai (born 1998) professional rugby union player; plays at hooker; member of the Auckland Blues (from 2020) in Super Rugby.
 Joseph Tole (1847–1920), lawyer; 19th-century Member of the New Zealand Parliament 1876–1887; Minister of Justice from 1884 to 1887 (St Peter's School)
 Soane Tongaʻuiha (born 1982), Tongan rugby union international representative; plays for the Northampton Saints; born in Tonga and educated in Auckland at St Peter's College
 John Francis Ernest Trenwith (1951–1998) MA (Hons) (1973) Auckland, writer, humorist and academic; Principal Lecturer, Advertising, Auckland Institute of Technology; known for his two comic novels, A50 among the Angels and A50 Revs Up Ronald Trubuhovich (Ronald Valentine) (born 1929) ONZM (1997, for services to medicine), Dux of St Peter's College in 1946 and 1947; medical doctor and pioneer of critical care medicine in Auckland; honoured in 2012 by being named an "old boy of distinction" of St Peter's College
 Patrick Tuipulotu (born 1993), New Zealand professional rugby union player; first selected as All Black on 1 June 2014
 Phillip Turner (born 1960), New Zealand Public Servant and Diplomat; New Zealand ambassador to Korea (April 2018 – present)

V

 Martin van Beynen (Martin John) (born 1959), MA (1982) Auck; Senior Journalist on The Press, Christchurch
 Sam Verlinden (born 1997), singer and actor – St Peter's College, Auckland
 Ivan Vuksich (born 1948), New Zealand soccer administrator

W
 Sean Wainui (23 October 1995 – 18 October 2021) New Zealand rugby union player for Bay of Plenty, the Chiefs in Super Rugby, and for New Zealand's Māori international side the Māori All Blacks.
 Reid Walker (born 2000), New Zealand actor who stars as recurring character Harry Warner in soap opera Shortland StreetMatthew Littlewood, "Wild about Harry", Stuff news, 27 October 2014 (Retrieved 11 August 2016)
 Ray Waru (born 1952), New Zealand television producer and director
 Tony Watkins  (L Anthony) (born 1938) BArch, MArch (Hons) (1967) Auck, DipTP, FNZIA, RIBA, architect, planner, and urban designer, author; lecturer at the University of Auckland in Vernacular Architecture 
 Peter Watt a teacher at St Peter's 1969–1972; 1980; and 1986–2016
 Mark Williams (born 1951), MA (Hons) (Auckland), PhD (British Columbia) (1983), academic, writer, critic, poet
 Zac Williams (born 1995), Olympic cyclist
 David Wong (born 1990), musician; bass guitar player; member of the band False Start; member of Incursa, a St Peter's College band which won the Smokefreerockquest in 2004
 James Wong (born 1991) musician (Keyboards) and songwriter; former member of band Shotgun Alley."Meet the Kiwi musos who helped to make Justin Bieber's upcoming single", Stuff, 26 February 2016 (Retrieved 8 January 2023)

See also

 List of former staff of St Peter's College, Auckland
 Congregation of Christian Brothers in New Zealand

 Notes 

 References 

Main sources

 Zealandia, 1939–1990.
 St Peter's College Magazines, St Peter's College, Auckland, 1948–2008.
 St Peter's College Silver Jubilee 1939–1964, Christian Brothers Old Boys Association, Auckland, 1964.
 J.C. O'Neill, The History of the Work of the Christian Brothers in New Zealand, unpublished Dip. Ed. thesis, University of Auckland, 1968.
 Felix Donnelly, One Priest's Life, Australia and New Zealand Book Company, Auckland, 1982.
 Paul Malcolm Robertson, Nga Parata Karaitiana The Christian Brothers, A Public Culture in Transition, A Comparative Study of the Indian and New Zealand Provinces, an unpublished thesis for MA in Anthropology, University of Auckland, 1996.
 NZ Catholic : the national Catholic newspaper, 1996– present.
 Graeme Donaldson, To All Parts of the Kingdom: Christian Brothers in New Zealand 1876–2001, Christian Brothers New Zealand Province, Christchurch, 2001.
 New Zealand Who's Who Aotearoa 2001, Alistair Taylor, Wellington, 2001.
 Nicholas Reid, James Michael Liston: A Life'', Victoria University Press, Wellington, 2006.
 

Lists of New Zealand people by school affiliation

St Peter's College, Auckland